, also written as 1997 QJ4, is a plutino and as such, it is trapped in a 2:3 mean-motion resonance with Neptune. It was discovered on 28 August, 1997, by Jane X. Luu, Chad Trujillo, David C. Jewitt and K. Berney. This object has a perihelion (closest approach to the Sun) at 30.463 AU and an aphelion (farthest approach from the Sun) at 48.038 AU, so it moves in a relatively eccentric orbit (0.224). It has an estimated diameter of 139 km; therefore, it is unlikely to be classified as a dwarf planet.

References

Sources 
 List of Trans Neptunian Objects, Minor Planet Center
 Another list of TNOs at johnstonsarchive

External links
 1997 QJ4, Luu, J. X., Trujillo, C., Jewitt, D., Berney, K., Williams, G. V. 1997, Minor Planet Electronic Circular, 1997-R09
 Close Approaches of Trans-Neptunian Objects to Pluto Have Left Observable Signatures on Their Orbital Distribution, Nesvorný, D., Roig, F., Ferraz-Mello, S. 2000, The Astronomical Journal, Volume 119, Issue 2, pp. 953–969
 Search for Cometary Activity in KBO (24952) , Meech, K. J., Hainaut, O. R., Boehnhardt, H., Delsanti, A. 2003, Earth, Moon, and Planets, Volume 92, Issue 1, pp. 169–181   
 (24952)  data at MPC
 

Plutinos
1997 QJ4
19970828
1997 QJ4
1997 QJ4